Soini may refer to:

People

Surname
 Emilia Soini, Finnish squash player
 Timo Soini, Finnish politician 
 Voitto Soini, Finnish ice hockey player
 Yrjö Soini, Finnish journalist

Given name
 Soini Nikkinen, Finnish javelin thrower
 Soini Palasto, Finnish diplomat

Places
 Soini, Finland